Pterynotus barclayanus is a species of sea snail in the family Muricidae, the murex or rock snails.

Description
This marine species attains a length of 25 mm.

Distribution
This marine species occurs in the Indian Ocean off Mauritius.

References

 Crosse, H., 1873. Diagnoses molluscorum novorum. Journal de Conchyliologie 21: 284-285
 Crosse, H., 1874. Description de Mollusques nouveaux. Journal de Conchyliologie 22: 71-76
 Fischer-Piette, E., 1950. Liste des types décrits dans le Journal de Conchyliologie et conservés dans la collection de ce journal (avec planches)(suite). Journal de Conchyliologie 90: 65-82

External links
 Adams, H. (1873). Descriptions of seventeen new species of land and marine shells. Proceedings of the Zoological Society of London. 1873: 205-209, pl. 23

barclayanus